Team 1717,  D’Penguineers, were a FIRST Robotics team associated with the Dos Pueblos High School Engineering Academy (DPEA) in Goleta, California. D’Penguineers have won multiple awards at the regional and international levels of the FIRST Robotics Competition, and participate regularly in outreach programs for junior high and elementary schools. The team was highlighted in the book The New Cool.

History
Team 1717, consisting of the 32-student senior class of the DPEA, began their first season during the 2005-2006 school year, under the direction of DPEA founder and director, Amir Abo-Shaeer. Since then, D’Penguineers have participated annually in the FIRST Robotics Competition, developing new techniques for student education, team communication, team collaboration, and build season preparation. Abo-Shaeer received a Macarthur Foundation award in 2010 for his work with the school and the team. Team 1717 was disbanded after the 2015 season.

Pre-build season
Preparations for the robotics build season begin at the launch of the school year, where Team 1717 students take both an Advanced Engineering class and an ROP FIRST Robotics class. During the months leading up to the competition, students begin to specialize, in areas such as computer programming, CAD, electronics, and machining working with mentors from the surrounding community. Throughout the year, the students are exposed not only to this educational specialization, but they also learn to manage the business aspects of the team—they also make up presentation teams, apparel managers, travel planners, and account managers, among others. The process of the actual creation of a robot, from initial brainstorms to paper planning to physical building, is a concept foreign to most high school students, and the pre-build season is devoted to developing the skills and team unity necessary to have a successful build season.

Build season
The FIRST Robotics Competition begins in January, when the game is revealed, and continues for six weeks, until the completed robot is shipped. Team 1717 assembles to watch the game video, and the build season is off to a running start. Over the following six weeks, each student on Team 1717 will spend over 360 hours working to collectively design, build, and program their game robot, as well as strategize and organize to find the most effective way to play the game.

Competitions
Once the Team 1717's bot has been shipped, D’Penguineers attend regional FIRST Robotics Competitions and compete for their chance to go to the international FIRST Championship. In past years, Team 1717 has attended regional competitions in San Diego, Los Angeles, Sacramento, and Arizona, and has qualified for the FIRST Championship in Atlanta, Georgia for three consecutive years.

Book
Team 1717 is also the subject of the book The New Cool, written by Neal Bascomb. The movie rights have been acquired by Walt Disney Motion Pictures Group, who are developing the book into a screenplay. The movie is set to be directed by Michael Bacall.

Awards
 2006 Southern California Regional: Rookie All-Star
 2006 Arizona Regional: Rookie Inspiration Award
 2007 San Diego Regional: Imagery Award, Regional Finalist
 2008 San Diego Regional: Delphi “Driving Tomorrow’s Technology”, Regional Winner
 2008 Los Angeles Regional: Delphi “Driving Tomorrow’s Technology”, Regional Winner
 2008 FIRST Championship: Finalist - Galileo Division
 2009 Sacramento Regional: Quality Award sponsored by Motorola, Regional Winner
 2009 Los Angeles Regional: Industrial Design Award sponsored by General Motors, Regional Finalist
 2009 FIRST Championship: Quality Award sponsored by Motorola, Finalist - Galileo Division
 2010 San Diego Regional: FIRST Dean’s List Finalist Award, Quality Award sponsored by Motorola, Regional Finalist
 2010 Los Angeles Regional: Engineering Inspiration Award, Regional Winner
 2010 FIRST Championship: Quality Award sponsored by Motorola
 2011 San Diego Regional: Quality Award sponsored by Motorola
 2011 Los Angeles Regional: Engineering Excellence Award sponsored by Delphi, Regional Finalist
 2012 Los Angeles Regional: Regional Winner
 2012 Central Valley Regional: Innovation in Control Award sponsored by Rockwell Automation, Regional Winner
 2012 FIRST Championship: Creativity Award sponsored by Xerox
 2013 Los Angeles Regional: Regional Winner
 2013 Las Vegas Regional: Regional Winner
 2013 Las Vegas Regional: Industrial Design Award sponsored by General Motors
 2013 FIRST Championship: Rockwell Automation in Control Award
 2014 Los Angeles Regional: Regional Winner
 2014 Las Vegas Regional: Regional Finalist
 2014 Los Angeles Regional: Engineering Excellence Award sponsored by Delphi
 2014 Las Vegas Regional: Industrial Design Award sponsored by General Motors
 2014 FIRST Championship: General Motors Industrial Design Award.
 2015 Ventura Regional: Regional Winner
 2015 Ventura Regional: Innovation in Control Award sponsored by Rockwell Automation
 2015 FIRST Championship: Innovation in Control Award sponsored by Rockwell Automation

References

FIRST Robotics Competition teams
Goleta, California
Education in Santa Barbara County, California